Fifth Freedom may refer to:

 Economic freedom, which U.S. President Herbert Hoover defined as a fifth freedom. 
 , the right for an airline to fly between two foreign countries during flights while the flight originates or ends in one's own country. 
 License to kill (concept), described as fifth freedom in the context of the Splinter Cell series of video games.